Rolando Fonseca Jiménez (born 6 June 1974) is a Costa Rican former professional footballer who played as a forward.

Nicknamed El Principito (The little prince) and El Rolo, Fonseca usually played just off the main striker and is renowned for his ability to create opportunities for his teammates and his fierce long shot.

Fonseca is the Costa Rica national team's all-time top goalscorer.

Club career
Fonseca played for Comunicaciones in Guatemala, Independiente Medellín and América de Cali in Colombia, Pachuca and La Piedad in Mexico, as well as having home spells with Saprissa, Alajuelense and Municipal Liberia.

In Costa Rica, he played a total of 271 games, scoring over 100 goals, between the league's two best teams, Saprissa and Alajuelense. His debut was with Deportivo Saprissa, on 1 June 1991, against ASODELI, and scored his first goal against San Carlos on 28 August. He also won Costa Rican championships in 1993–94, 1994–95 (Saprissa), and 1996–97, 2001–02, 2002–03 and 2004–05 (Alajuelense), adding three CONCACAF Champions' Cups in 1993, 1995 (Saprissa), and 2004 (Alajuelense). Outside Costa Rica, Fonseca won league titles with Comunicaciones in 1998, 1999, 2000, 2002, 2008, and 2010, and with América de Cali in 1997.

After solid performances with Alajuelense and the national team, Fonseca received offers in 2007 from China, Chile, Turkey and Major League Soccer, but finally settled, as co-owner, player and captain of Municipal Liberia. Although he was having a great season, he left the project a few days before finishing the Apertura tournament, apparently due to personal issues and some differences with then co-owner Mario Sotela. Rumors surfaced that Fonseca would return to Alajuelense, but they were all quickly discarded.

After failed negotiations with Brujas, Fonseca returned to Comunicaciones, a team he had already represented on two other spells, remaining as one of side's best imports ever. Fonseca retired in January 2011, but a year and seven months later, he made his return to professional football by joining Asociación Deportiva Carmelita on 19 August 2012. After three matches with Carmelita, he was released in September 2012. Coach Orlando de León cited that Fonseca has been busy with his other activities besides football.<ref>Umaña, Johan. "Carmelita evalúa dar de baja a Rolando Fonseca". La Nación", 24 September 2012. Retrieved on 26 May 2013.</ref>

International career
Fonseca has also been a fixture on the Costa Rica national team since 1992. He played in more than 100 internationals, and is currently the nation's all-time scorer, with 47 goals.

Fonseca earned his first cap at the age of 17 on 27 May 1992, in a friendly match against Ecuador. By November of that year, he appeared in a 1994 World Cup qualifier against St. Vincent and the Grenadines, the first of his five World Cup qualifying campaigns for Costa Rica.FIFA. "FIFA Player Statistics: Rolando FONSECA". Retrieved on 26 May 2013. The following year saw Fonseca's first international goal, which came on 9 March in an UNCAF Nations Cup match against Panama.Reyes, Macario. "UNCAF Tournament 1993". RSSSF, 2 June 2003. Retrieved on 26 May 2013.

By late 1996, Fonseca had become a regular in the national team, playing four World Cup qualifiers in the fall. He scored a hat trick against Honduras in the 1997 UNCAF Nations Cup, the first of three in his international career. He earned a call to the squad for the Copa América in Bolivia, but he appeared only in the first-round match against Mexico as the team lost all three group games.

At the turn of the millennium, Fonseca was entering the highest-scoring stretch of his international career; he scored eight times for Costa Rica in 1999, six times in 2000, and twelve times in 2001. During the same period, Costa Rica rose fast in CONCACAF, finishing in first place in World Cup qualifying. At the 2001 Copa América, Fonseca appeared in all four matches and scored against Bolivia, as the Costa Ricans won their first-round group with a team that also included Paulo César Wanchope, Walter Centeno, and Hernán Medford. Fonseca played in two games for the team at the 2002 World Cup, appearing in the first-round matches against China and Brazil.

Fonseca remained in the national team after the World Cup, playing in the 2003 CONCACAF Gold Cup and scoring twice against the United States, but he was limited to only one cap in 2004 and two in 2005. He was excluded from the 2006 FIFA World Cup squad selected by Alexandre Guimarães. Upon the appointment of former teammate Medford as national coach, however, Fonseca returned to the national team in early 2007. He appeared only once for Costa Rica during the two-year span after the 2007 CONCACAF Gold Cup, but he was recalled late in 2009 for the last stages of World Cup qualifying by coach René Simões. Fonseca played his final competitive international match in the intercontinental playoff match against Uruguay on 18 November 2009, coming off the bench for the last 26 minutes.FIFA. "Match Report – Uruguay – Costa Rica 1:1 (0:0)". 18 November 2009. Retrieved on 26 May 2013.

His 47th and last international goal came against Chile, in a spectacular strike with his back to the goal, which also meant the number 1000 for Costa Rica in international matches. The all-time top scorer in the UNCAF Nations Cup with 19 goals, Fonseca was voted the tournament's best player in 1999, adding five goals.

On 26 March 2011, Rolando Fonseca played in the first game of the new Costa Rican Estadio Nacional against China. He substituted Álvaro Saborío in the 78th minute. This was his last game with the Costa Rica national football team, as he retired from international play as Costa Rica's all-time leading scorer.

International goalsScores and results list Costa Rica's goal tally first, score column indicates score after each Fonseca goal''.

Honours
 CONCACAF Champions' Cup: 1993, 1995, 2004
 Costa Rican Championship: 1993–94, 1994–95, 1996–97, 2001–02, 2004–05
 Liga Nacional de Guatemala: 1998–99, 1999–00 Apertura, Apertura 2008, Apertura 2010–2011

See also
 List of top international men's football goalscorers by country
 List of men's footballers with 100 or more international caps

References

External links
 
 Rolando Fonseca Jiménez at SoloCremas 
 
 
 

1974 births
Living people
Footballers from San José, Costa Rica
Association football forwards
Costa Rican footballers
Costa Rica international footballers
Costa Rican men's futsal players
1997 Copa América players
2001 UNCAF Nations Cup players
2001 Copa América players
2002 CONCACAF Gold Cup players
2002 FIFA World Cup players
2003 UNCAF Nations Cup players
2003 CONCACAF Gold Cup players
2007 UNCAF Nations Cup players
2007 CONCACAF Gold Cup players
FIFA Century Club
Deportivo Saprissa players
C.F. Pachuca players
Independiente Medellín footballers
América de Cali footballers
L.D. Alajuelense footballers
Comunicaciones F.C. players
Municipal Liberia footballers
A.D. Carmelita footballers
Liga FPD players
Categoría Primera A players
Costa Rican expatriate footballers
Costa Rican expatriate sportspeople in Mexico
Expatriate footballers in Mexico
Costa Rican expatriate sportspeople in Colombia
Expatriate footballers in Colombia
Costa Rican expatriate sportspeople in Guatemala
Expatriate footballers in Guatemala
Copa Centroamericana-winning players